eLabFTW is a web application written by Nicolas Carpi in PHP which can be used to create personal and common logbooks. It has been developed at the Curie Institute originally. Besides there, it is used on universities around the world 

eLabFTW is licensed under the GNU Affero General Public License as free software. It is translated into seven languages.

Description 

eLabFTW is a free and open-source lab book. It is written in PHP and uses a MySQL database. Docker containers are also available. Among the various features are

 Secure. Entries and transmission are encrypted
 Timestamps. RFC 3161 compliant timestamping of experiments.
 Inventory management. Apart from experience logs, it also can manage the inventory
 Import and export. Entries can be imported and exported

Platforms 

eLabFTW is a PHP package with Mysql database. Therefore, it can be executed on most servers. Furthermore, the docker containers allow to run it almost everywhere.

Usage 

eLabFTW is used by various universities, like University of Alberta, Berkeley University, Hanover Medical School, Cardiff University and UMC Utrecht

External links 
 
 Online demo logbook

References 

Web applications
Free software projects